Anthony Warner (born 1973) is a British chef and food writer and the author of the Angry Chef blog. His first book, The Angry Chef, has been seen as a reaction to and debunking of food faddism.

Early life
Anthony Warner was born in 1973. He has a BSc degree in biochemistry from Manchester University.

Career
Warner has worked as a chef for most of his career. He started his food blog The Angry Chef at the end of 2015. In 2016 he sold the rights to his first book The Angry Chef: Bad Science and the Truth About Healthy Eating to Oneworld Publications. It was published in 2017 and has been seen as a reaction to and debunking of food faddism and unscientific advice about food promoted by advocates of "clean eating" and celebrities such as Gwyneth Paltrow.

Selected publications
The Angry Chef: Bad science and the truth about healthy eating. Oneworld Publications, 2017. 
 The Angry Chef's Guide to Spotting Bullsh*t in the World of Food. The Experiment, 2018. 
 The Truth about Fat. Oneworld Publications, 2019

References

External links
Official website

Living people
British chefs
British food writers
1973 births
Alumni of Manchester Metropolitan University
British bloggers
Critics of alternative medicine
Diet food advocates